A motorman, also known as a qualified member of the engineering department (QMED), is the seniormost rate in the engine room of a ship.  The motorman performs a variety of tasks connected with the maintenance and repair of engine room, fireroom, machine shop, ice-machine room, and steering-engine room equipment. The motorman inspects equipment such as pumps, turbines, distilling plants, and condensers, and prepares record of condition. The motorman lubricates and maintains machinery and equipment such as generators, steering systems, lifeboats, and sewage disposal systems, and also cleans and restores tools and equipment.

United States
In the United States Merchant Marine, in order to be occupied as a QMED a person has to have a Merchant Mariner Credential issued by the United States Coast Guard with a QMED certification.  Because of international conventions and agreements, all QMEDs who sail internationally are similarly documented by their respective countries.

Applicants for QMED are required to pass a QMED General Knowledge Examination and at least one of the following rating exams:
Fireman/Watertender
Oiler
Junior Engineer
Electrician/Refrigerating Engineer
Pumpman/Machinist

Once the exam is passed, the results are valid towards an upgrade to QMED from Wiper for one year.

See also

Engine room
Engineering department
Seafarer's professions and ranks

References

External links
United States Coast Guard Merchant Mariner Licensing and Documentation web site
QMED at DOL 
QMED Requirements at MSC 

Marine occupations